is a railway station on the Kagoshima Main Line, operated by JR Kyushu in Hakata-ku, Fukuoka, Fukuoka City, Fukuoka Prefecture, Japan.

Lines

Layout
The station consists of an island platform serving two tracks. Two through-tracks run on either side of the platform tracks and several sidings branch these two tracks.

Adjacent stations

History
The station was opened by Japanese Government Railways (JGR) on 21 September 1913 as an added station on the existing Kagoshima Main Line track. With the privatization of Japanese National Railways (JNR), the successor of JGR, on 1 April 1987, JR Kyushu took over control of the station.

Since 2009 the station has been subject to extensive renovations which have included the installation of elevators, roofing and new stairs.

Passenger statistics
In fiscal 2016, the station was used by 7,897 passengers daily, and it ranked 20th among the busiest stations of JR Kyushu.

Surrounding area
Takeshita Station is close to a major Asahi beer plant. This plant includes a Beer garden that is popular with visitors during the summer season.

The station is convenient for those who need to go to the Kyushu University School of Design.

The Nishitetsu Ōhashi Station of the Tenjin Ōmuta Line is located 1.08 km south-west of the elevated walkway.

Bus connections
The station is served by the Nishitetsu local bus routes from 
 □ 46
 Asahi Beer (アサヒビール前)→Eki-minami nichōme (駅南二丁目)→Ekimae yonchōme (駅前四丁目)→Hakata Station→Canal City Hakata→Haruyoshi (春吉)→Tenjin→Shimin kaikan mae (市民会館前)→Hakata Futō (博多埠頭)
 ■ 46
 Gojūkawa itchome (五十川一丁目)→Gojūkawa (五十川)→Ijiri Station→Minami-Fukuoka Station→Zasshonokuma eigyōsho (雑餉隈営業所)

See also 
List of railway stations in Japan

References

External links
Takeshita (JR Kyushu)

Railway stations in Japan opened in 1913
Railway stations in Fukuoka Prefecture